"Hot Hot Hot!!!" is the name of a 1988 single by British rock band The Cure from their album Kiss Me, Kiss Me, Kiss Me. The song reached number 45 in the UK, whereas it was more successful in Ireland where it reached number 18, and in Spain where it reached the Top 10.

History
"Hot Hot Hot!!!" was the fourth single released from the album Kiss Me, Kiss Me, Kiss Me—the band's seventh LP. In early 1988, it spent three weeks in the UK Singles Chart, peaking at number 45 on 20 February of that year. In the United States, the song reached number 65 on the Billboard Hot 100, while a remix of the track by François Kevorkian charted at numbers 11 and 50 on the Dance Music/Club Play Singles and the Hot Dance Music/Maxi-Singles Sales charts, respectively. It reached its highest chart position in Spain, peaking at number 8; the song was also a hit in Ireland, spending two weeks there and making number 18 on 18 February 1988. It spent three weeks on the Dutch charts, reaching number 79 there. As with many other singles, the video was directed by Tim Pope, and has been described as "intentionally ridiculous". Filmed in black and white, it featured the band as "dwarves" dressed in 1950s clothes.

Reception
In a review of the single for NME in 1988, Steve Lamacq said that the song's dance mix was "spuriously welcoming, but basically a tragedy of trenchfoot" and concluded, "Even I know [Smith has] better stuff hidden in that mop of his". In an undated review, Stewart Mason of Allmusic described the song as the "weakest" of the singles from the album, adding that it has markedly dated and criticised both Smith's lyrics and his vocal performance.

Re-recordings and cover versions
The song appears on disc two of the live album Bestival Live 2011.

Trivia
Before the song starts, Robert Smith sings the first line of "She" by Charles Aznavour, "She may be the face I can't forget(...)".

Track listing

7": Elektra / 7-69424 United States 
 "Hot Hot Hot!!!" (Remix) - 3:33
 "Hey You!!!" (Remix) - 2:23

MC: Elektra / 9 66783-4 United States 
 "Hot Hot Hot!!!" (Remix) - 3:33
 "Hey You!!!" (Extended Remix) - 4:06

 released in longbox

12": Fiction / Ficsx 28 United Kingdom 
 "Hot Hot Hot!!!" (Extended Remix) - 7:03
 "Hot Hot Hot!!!" (Remix) - 3:33
 "Hey You!!!" (Extended Remix) - 4:06

 All mixes by François Kevorkian
 also released on CD Fixcd 28

Personnel
Robert Smith - vocals, guitars, keyboards
Lol Tolhurst - keyboards
Porl Thompson - guitars
Simon Gallup - basses
Boris Williams - drums, percussion
Roger O'Donnell - keyboards (video only)

References

1986 songs
The Cure songs
Songs written by Robert Smith (musician)
1988 singles
Songs written by Lol Tolhurst
Songs written by Porl Thompson
Songs written by Boris Williams
Fiction Records singles
Songs written by Simon Gallup
Song recordings produced by David M. Allen